Richard Foster Baker (January 25, 1857 - February 21, 1921) was a director and actor in the U.S. during the silent movie era.

Richard Foster Baker was born January 25, 1857, in Detroit, Wayne, Michigan, USA. He died February 21, 1921, in Chicago, Illinois, USA.

Selected filmography
 The Rosary (1911)
 Her Dad the Constable (1911)
 God's Inn by the Sea (1911)
 The Gordian Knot (1911)
 Fate's Funny Frolic (1911)
 The Burglarized Burglar (1911)
 Lost Years (1911)
 The Fable of the Roistering Blades (1915)
 The Fable of Elvira and Farina and the Meal Ticket (1915)
 Sweedie Goes to College (1915)
 On Trial (1917)
 Kidder & Ko (1918)

References

External links
 
 

1857 births
1921 deaths
American film directors
Male actors from Detroit